The Armed Forces of the Philippines Special Operations Command (AFPSOCOM) is the unified special operations command of the AFP. It is responsible for planning, conducting, and supporting special operations. Although the current command was established in April 2018, the date marked as the official anniversary of AFPSOCOM is January 16, 1978 - the same date the Philippine Army Special Warfare Brigade (ASWABde) was organized, to which AFPSOCOM traces its origins.

History
The AFPSOCOM traces its roots to the Philippine Army Special Warfare Brigade (ASWABde) that was organized in January 1978. The Army Special Warfare Brigade was the first attempt to unify the specialties of two army units with the most highly trained personnel of the Armed Forces of the Philippines (AFP), the Special Forces and the Scout Rangers, and structure their collective efforts into a highly effective army unit. Disbanded in 1986, it was reactivated as the Philippine Army Special Operations Command (PA-SOCOM) in 1995. It has been headquartered in Fort Magsaysay, Nueva Ecija since its reactivation, and was expanded in 2004 to accommodate the then newly activated Light Reaction Company.

On April 6, 2018, the PA-SOCOM was elevated to an Armed Forces combatant command and became the AFPSOCOM. The AFP Joint Special Operations Group (AFP-JSOG) was also disbanded and its officers, enlisted personnel and units was transferred to form the core of the new command. The units transferred from the AFP-JSOG included not just the Light Reaction Regiment, but also the Naval Special Operations Group and the 710th Special Operations Wing. The AFP-JSOG K-9 Platoon was also included into the new command.

Mission
The mission of the AFPSOCOM is to plan, conduct and support special operations in all operational environments in support of the fundamental missions of the entire Armed Forces of the Philippines.

Core capabilities
SOCOM forces are employed based on the following core capabilities:
 Direct Action
 International and domestic Counter-terrorist Operations
 HVT Raids
 Humanitarian Assistance/ Disaster Response
 Sabotage
 Security Assistance
 Special Reconnaissance
 Unconventional Warfare

Training
The AFPSOCOM training regimen comprises different types of training. These training methods are employed to enhance the skills and abilities of the different units under the command.
 Basic Airborne Course
 Basic Naval Special Warfare Course
 Close Quarter Combat Training
 Combat Diver’s Course
 Jumpmaster Course
 Military Freefall Course
 Parachute Packing, Maintenance and Air Delivery Course
 Scout Ranger Target Interdiction Course

Units
The current AFP Special Operations Command is organized into:

 Scout Ranger Regiment - Organizes, trains, equips and provides rapidly deployable forces and conducts special operations in support of SOCOM's mission. The unit was modeled after the intelligence-gathering American Alamo Scouts and the combat-ready US Army Rangers. The regiment's core capabilities are: direct action, jungle warfare, special reconnaissance, and sniping operations against hostile positions.
 Special Forces Regiment (Philippine Army) - Organizes, trains, equips and provides rapidly deployable forces and conducts unconventional warfare in all types of operational environment in support of SOCOM's mission. The Special Forces specializes on the following: unconventional warfare, direct action; special reconnaissance; psychological warfare and mass base operations.
 Light Reaction Regiment - The premier counter-terrorist unit of the Philippine Army and the Special operations force of the Armed Forces of the Philippines. It was formerly known as the Light Reaction Battalion and the Light Reaction Company before finally being upgraded into a regimental unit. Due to its specialization in counter-terrorism operations and its formation with the assistance of American advisers, the Light Reaction Regiment has been sometimes referred to as the Philippines' Delta Force.
 Naval Special Operations Command - The Naval Special Operations Command  (NAVSOCOM) is a unit of the Philippine Navy trained in special operations, sabotage, psychological and unconventional warfare and is heavily influenced by the United States Navy SEALs.
 Marine Special Operations Group - The Marine Special Operations Group (MARSOG) was formerly known as the Force Reconnaissance Battalion of the Philippine Marine Corps. It served similar missions to the now defunct Philippine Navy Special Operations Group.
 710th Special Operations Wing - The 710th SPOW is the Special operations unit of the Philippine Air Force handling hostage rescue and counter-terrorist operations.
AFP SOCOM K-9 Platoon - Highly trained canine unit transferred from the deactivated AFP Joint Special Operations Group.

References

Bibliography
 The Philippine Army Public Affairs Office, The Philippine Army: First 100 Years, 1997, OTAPA.
 The Special Forces School, Philippine Army Special Forces Operations Manual PAM 3-071, 2008, SFR(A).
 Dennis V. Eclarin, Scout Ranger Combat Guide (Third Edition), 2003, The Philippine Star.
 Pobre, Cesar P. (2006). History of the Armed Forces of the Filipino People. New Day Publishers..
 Ryan, Mike (2008). The Operators: Inside the World's Special Forces. Skyhorse Publishing. .
 Southby-Tailyour, Ewen (2005). Jane's Special Forces Recognition Guide. HarpersCollins Publishers. .
 Conboy, Ken. South-East Asian Special Forces. London, UK: Osprey Publishing, 1991

Commands of the Philippine Army
Special forces of the Philippines